Costa Rica competed in the Summer Olympic Games for the first time at the 1936 Summer Olympics in Berlin, Germany. A single competitor, Bernardo de la Guardia, took part in the individual sabre event.

Fencing

One fencer represented Costa Rica in 1936.

Men's sabre
 Bernardo de la Guardia

References

External links
Official Olympic Reports

Nations at the 1936 Summer Olympics
1936 Summer Olympics
1936 in Costa Rica